Samuel Cutts (December 8, 1726May 29, 1801) was an American merchant and politician.

Cutts was the son of Richard and Eunice (Curtis) Cutts of Portsmouth, New Hampshire, where he was born in 1726.  His entire life was passed in his native town where he became a prosperous merchant, a representative to the New Hampshire General Court and a member of the New Hampshire Provincial Congress.  He was married at Cambridge, Massachusetts, December 8, 1762 to Anne Holyoke (1735-1812).  He died at Portsmouth, May 29, 1801.

In 1774, he met with Paul Revere and helped coordinate with local patriots for the raid on Fort William and Mary.

References

1726 births
1801 deaths
People from Portsmouth, New Hampshire
Colonial American merchants
Members of the New Hampshire General Court
People of colonial New Hampshire
Patriots in the American Revolution